The winners of the 11th Vancouver Film Critics Circle Awards, honoring the best in filmmaking in 2010, were announced on January 11, 2011.

Winners and nominees

International

Canadian

References

2010
2010 film awards
Van
2010 in British Columbia